= HD 220466 =

Star in the constellation Aquarius

Observation data Epoch J2000.0 Equinox J2000.0 (ICRS)
- Constellation: Aquarius
- Right ascension: 23^{h} 24^{m} 03.97937^{s}
- Declination: −21° 46′ 27.8824″
- Apparent magnitude (V): 6.50

Characteristics
- Evolutionary stage: main sequence
- Spectral type: F3IV/V
- U−B color index: −0.03
- B−V color index: +0.42

Astrometry
Radial velocity (R_{v})	24.5 km/s
Proper motion (μ)	RA: −68.050 mas/yr Dec.: −77.697 mas/yr
Parallax (π)	15.3570±0.0292 mas
Distance	212.4 ± 0.4 ly (65.1 ± 0.1 pc)
Absolute magnitude (M_{V})	2.50

Details
Mass	1.4 M_{☉}
Radius	2.3 R_{☉}
Luminosity	8.8 L_{☉}
Surface gravity (log g)	3.86 cgs
Temperature	6,580 K
Metallicity [Fe/H]	−0.18 dex
Age	2.0 Gyr

Other designations
- BD−22°6119, HD 220466, HIP 115522, SAO 191873

Database references
SIMBAD	data

HD 220466 is an F-type main sequence star in the constellation Aquarius. It has apparent magnitude 6.5 and is about 212 light-years away.

In 1913, an apparent visual companion of apparent magnitude 10.3 was observed 1.9 arcseconds away from the star, but it is doubtful whether it exists.

The 17th-magnitude red dwarf UCAC4 342-200228 18″ away from HD 220466 forms a common proper motion pairing. Any orbit would take tens of thousands of years.
